The Mercedes-Benz W194 (also 300 SL) is an endurance racer produced by Mercedes-Benz for the 1952 Sportscar racing season, its first after World War II.

Powered by the 3.0 litre SOHC straight-6 M194 engine, it ran off an impressive string of victories that included   24 Hours of Le Mans, Bern-Bremgarten, the Eifelrennen at Nürburgring, and Mexico's Carrera Panamericana.

Only ten W194s were made. It was succeeded by the Mercedes-Benz 300 SLR. This led to the iconic Mercedes 300 SL W198 Gullwing road car in 1954.

Design 
The racing W194 300 SL was built around a mere 140-150 pound welded aluminium tube spaceframe chassis to offset the relatively underpowered  M194 engine. Designed by Daimler-Benz's chief developing engineer, Rudolf Uhlenhaut, the metal skeleton saved weight while still providing a high level of strength. Since it enveloped the passenger compartment traditional doors were impossible, giving birth to the model's distinctive gull-wing arrangement.

Like the production 300 SL "Gullwing" it birthed, the W194 used a variant of the overhead cam straight 6 M186 engine introduced with the flagship four-door 300 (W186 "Adenauer") luxury tourer in 1951. Its M194 engine received the high-output triple two-barrel Solex carburetor setup from the exclusive 300 S (W188) coupe/cabriolet. Designed with an innovative diagonal aluminium head (that allowed for larger intake and exhaust valves) and canted at a fifty-degree angle to the left to fit under the W194's much lower hoodline, it produced   in racing trim, considerably up from the 300's . Top speed was approximately 160 mph (257 km/h). A fuel-injected version of the M194, the M198, was developed two years later for the introduction of the production 300SL in 1954.

Aerodynamics played an important role in the 2497 pound car's speed. Unlike many cars of the 1950s, steering was relatively precise and the four-wheel independent suspension allowed for a reasonably comfortable ride and markedly better overall handling. However, the rear swing axle, jointed only at the differential, not at the wheels themselves, could be treacherous at high speeds or on imperfect roads due to extreme changes in camber.  The enormous fuel tank capacity also caused a considerable difference in handling depending on the quantity of fuel on board.

Racing history 

In 1952, the W194 scored overall wins at the 24 Hours of Le Mans, in Bern-Bremgarten, in the sportscar race of the Eifelrennen at the Nürburgring, and in Mexico's Carrera Panamericana. It also managed second and fourth places at its first outing, the Mille Miglia in 1952 and won the Rally Stella Alpina in 1955 in its last edition.

These successes, especially those on the high speed open road races, were rather surprising as the M194 engine was fitted only with carburetors (triple 2-barrel Solex), producing , which was not only less than the competing cars by Ferrari and Jaguar, but also less than the fuel-injected 300 SL road car developed from it and introduced two years later 1954. Low weight and low aerodynamic drag made the W194 fast enough to be competitive in endurance races.

Production 300 SL 

Daimler-Benz's official importer in the USA, New York Mercedes distributor Max Hoffman, suggested to company management in Stuttgart that a street version of the W194 would be a commercial success, especially in America.  The result was an icon, the 1954 Mercedes-Benz 300 SL Gullwing (W198).

More than 80% of the vehicle's total production of approximately 1400 units were sold in the US, making the Gullwing the first Mercedes-Benz widely successful outside its home market and thoroughly validating Hoffman's prediction. The 300 SL is credited with changing the company's image in America from a manufacturer of solid but staid luxury automobiles to one capable of rendering high-performance sports  cars.

The W194 today 
The W194 is regarded by some as the most important post-World War II Mercedes-Benz made. It is unknown how many of the original 10 W194s manufactured remain.  Only one never raced, Chassis #00002, which served as a parts and training car.  It has been fully restored by a Mercedes-Benz team and though not for sale received multiple offers of $15 million USD in 2012.

See also 

 Mercedes-Benz W196
 Mercedes-Benz 300 SLR (W196S)
 Mercedes-Benz SL-Class

References

Notes

Bibliography

 
  
 

W194
Sports prototypes
Le Mans winning cars